Kotayk Brewery, is a brewing company founded in 1974 in Abovyan, Kotayk Province, Armenia.

History
Kotayk Brewery was founded in 1974, as a state-owned enterprise by the government of the Armenian Soviet Socialist Republic, with a limited scale of production. After the completion of the entire equipment, the factory started large-scale production in 1978.

After the dissolution of the Soviet Union, Gagik Tsarukyan took over the brewery in 1995 and started to produce beer under the brands Kotayk and Artsakh. In 1997, Castel Group became the major shareholders of the brewery through an investment of US$17 million, being one of the earliest foreign investors in Armenia. In March 2006, Tsarukyan sold his 29% share in the brewery to Castel Group for US$4 million. However, the company was sold back to Gagik Tsarukyan's Multi Group Concern in June 2011, to become a limited liability company.

Production
The brewery produces six varieties of beer:
Kotayk Gold (alc. 4.7%)
Kotayk Lager (alc. 4.2%)
Kotayk Tshani (alc. 4.5%)
Erebuni Strong (alc. 6.4%)
Erebuni (alc. 4.7%)
Urartu (alc. 4%)

References

External links
KOTAYK Brewery's Official website
A review

Beer in Armenia
Drink companies of the Soviet Union
Food and drink companies established in 1974
Beer brands
Armenian brands
1974 establishments in Armenia